The 2018–19 FC Arsenal Tula season was the club's third season back in the Russian Premier League, the highest tier of association football in Russia, since relegation at the end of the 2014–15 season, and their fourth in total. Arsenal Tula finished the season in 6th and were knocked out of the Russian Cup by Ural Yekaterinburg in the semifinals. Due to Ural's defeat to Lokomotiv Moscow in the Cup Final, Arsenal Tula qualified for the 2019–20 UEFA Europa League qualifying stages for the first time.

Season events
On 1 June, Oleg Kononov was announced as Arsenal Tula's new manager. Kononov left Arsenal Tula by mutual consent on  12 November, with Igor Cherevchenko being announced as his replacement on 13 November.

Squad

Transfers

Summer

In:

Out:

Winter

In:

Out:

Competitions

Russian Premier League

Results by round

Results

League table

Russian Cup

Squad statistics

Appearances and goals

|-
|colspan="14"|Players away from the club on loan:
|-
|colspan="14"|Players who left Arsenal Tula during the season:

|}

Goal scorers

Disciplinary record

References

External links

FC Arsenal Tula seasons
Arsenal Tula